Corymbia serendipita is a species of tree that is endemic to north Queensland. It has rough flaky or tessellated bark on most or all of the trunk, smooth bark above, lance-shaped or curved adult leaves, flower buds in groups of seven and urn-shaped fruit.

Description
It has thin, rough, flaky to tessellated bark on part or all of the trunk, smooth powdery white to cream-coloured or grey bark above. Flowering has been observed in February.

Taxonomy and naming
This bloodwood was first formally described in 1994 by Ian Brooker and David Kleinig and given the name Eucalyptus serendipita. The description was published in their book Field Guide to Eucalypts, Volume 3, from specimens they collected near Forsayth in 1992. In 2002, Anthony Bean changed the name to Corymbia serendipita in the journal Austrobaileya.

Distribution and habitat
Corymbia serendipita grows in thin sandy soil on sandstone hills on the ranges between Georgetown, Einasleigh and Forsayth and south to the White Mountains.

Conservation status
This species is listed as of "least concern" under the Queensland Government Nature Conservation Act 1992

See also
List of Corymbia species

References

serendipita
Myrtales of Australia
Flora of Queensland
Plants described in 1994
Taxa named by Ian Brooker